Gillingham is a small village and civil parish in the English county of Norfolk.

History
Gillingham's name is of Anglo-Saxon origin and derives from the Old English for the homestead or village of Gylla's people.

In the Domesday Book, Gillingham is listed as a settlement of 34 households in the hundred of Clavering. In 1086, the village formed part of the East Anglian estates of King William I.

Gillingham Hall is located within the parish and was built in the early-Sixteenth Century as a residence for Sir Nicholas Bacon. Today, the hall is owned by Edward Haughey.

On the night of the 6th and 7th of November 1943, a Dornier 17 light bomber crashed in the village after being shot down by anti-aircraft fire whilst on a bombing raid of Norwich. Only one of the crew survived and attempts were made by the Norfolk and Suffolk Aviation Museum during the 1970s.

On 13 March 2014, a helicopter crashed shortly after take-off from Gillingham Hall, killing all four people on board, including Edward Haughey, Baron Ballyedmond, the owner of Gillingham Hall.

Geography
According to the 2011 Census, Gillingham has a population of 2,871 residents living in 1,269 households.

Gillingham falls within the constituency of South Norfolk and is represented at Parliament by Richard Bacon MP of the Conservative Party. For the purposes of local government, the parish falls within the district of South Norfolk.

St. Mary's Church
Gillingham's parish church was largely rebuilt in the mid-Nineteenth Century by Thomas Penrice and is dedicated to Saint Mary. The church falls within the Deanery of Loddon which, in turn, is located in the Archdeaconry of Norfolk.

Gillingham is also home to the Church of Our Lady of Perpetual Succour Roman Catholic Church, which was built in late-Nineteenth Century by the Kenyon family of Gillingham Hall.

Amenities
The majority of local children attend St. Michael's Church of England Primary Academy, which was rated as 'Good' by Ofsted in 2018. The majority of children then attend either Hobart High School in Loddon or Sir John Leman High School in Beccles.

The village also has a playground, allotments and a village hall.

Transport
The village currently has a regular bus service to much of the surrounding area. First Norfolk & Suffolk run the X2 through the village, which gives access to Beccles, Loddon, Norwich and Lowestoft as well as the smaller surrounding villages and BorderBus run the 580 to Beccles, Bungay, Harleston and Diss and the connecting 581 to Beccles and Great Yarmouth and the 146 which runs between Norwich and Lowestoft via Loddon and Beccles. Bus services to other areas can be found in Beccles.

Notable people
 Admiral Henry Eden (1798-1888)- British naval officer 
 Edward Haughey, Baron Ballyedmond (1944-2014)- Irish-British entrepreneur and politician

Notes

External links

S Norfolk Council

Villages in Norfolk
Civil parishes in Norfolk